Valaxa is a Greek island in the Sporades.  It is located southwest of the island Skyros, and is administratively a part of Skyros.

Nearest Islands and Islets
Its nearest islands and islets are Erinia to the west and Skyros to the north and east.

Landforms of Euboea (regional unit)
Islands of Central Greece
Islands of Greece